Granulodiplodia is a genus of fungi in the family Botryosphaeriaceae. There are six species.

Species
Granulodiplodia abnormis
Granulodiplodia adelinensis
Granulodiplodia granulosa
Granulodiplodia granulosella
Granulodiplodia megalospora
Granulodiplodia stangeriae

References

External links

Botryosphaeriales
Dothideomycetes genera